Jack Hamilton (Jake) Warren, OC (April 10, 1921 – April 1, 2008) was a diplomat, civil servant and banker. Jake Warren began his career with External Affairs in 1945 after serving in the Royal Canadian Navy during World War II, but served in civil service posts from the late 1950s to early 1970s:

 Canadian representative to the General Agreement on Tariffs and Trade, 1960–64
 Deputy Minister, Department of Trade and Commerce 1958-60 and 1964–71

He returned to the diplomatic roll as the Canadian High Commissioner to the United Kingdom from 1971 to 1974, then Canadian Ambassador to the United States from 1975 to 1977.

He was Vice-Chairman and a Director of the Bank of Montreal from 1979 to 1986. From 1986 to 1990, he was the Deputy North America Chairman of the Trilateral Commission and served as trade advisor to the province of Quebec.

In 1982, he was made an Officer of the Order of Canada.

Sources

External links
 Jack Hamilton Warren at The Canadian Encyclopedia

1921 births
2008 deaths
Ambassadors of Canada to the United States
High Commissioners of Canada to the United Kingdom
Canadian military personnel of World War II
Officers of the Order of Canada
People from Chatham-Kent